This page shows the progress of Southend United F.C. in the 2012–13 football season. During this campaign, they played their third successive season in the fourth tier of English football, League Two.

Squad statistics

Appearances and goals

|-
|colspan="14"|Players who no longer play for Southend United but have made appearances this season:

|}

Top scorers

Disciplinary record

Pre-season friendlies

Competitions

League Two

League table

Results by round

Matches

FA Cup

League Cup

Football League Trophy

Transfers

In

Loans in

Out

Loans out

References

Southend United F.C. seasons
Southend United